The following is the list of High Commissioners and ambassadors from Australia. The information below is current .

Embassies and High Commissions

International organisations

Special interests

Notes

: The Ambassador of Australia to Argentina is also accredited to Paraguay and Uruguay as a non-resident ambassador.
: The Ambassador of Australia to Austria is also accredited to Bosnia and Herzegovina, Hungary, Kosovo, Slovakia, and Slovenia as a non-resident ambassador. The Ambassador also acts as Australia's Resident Representative and Governor on the Board of Governors of the International Atomic Energy Agency (IAEA), and Permanent Representative to the United Nations Office in Vienna and Permanent Representative to the Comprehensive Test Ban Treaty (CTBTO) Preparatory Commission.
: The Ambassador of Australia to Belgium is also accredited to Luxembourg as a non-resident ambassador. The Ambassador also acts as Australia's Ambassador to the European Union and NATO.
: The Ambassador of Australia to Chile is also accredited to Colombia, Ecuador and Venezuela as a non-resident ambassador.
: The Ambassador of Australia to Egypt is also accredited to Eritrea, Sudan and Syria as a non-resident ambassador.
: The Ambassador of Australia to Ethiopia is also accredited to Djibouti and South Sudan as a non-resident ambassador. The Ambassador also acts as Australia's Permanent Representative to the African Union.
: The Ambassador of Australia to the Federated States of Micronesia is also accredited to the Marshall Islands and Palau as a non-resident ambassador. The Ambassador is also the Australian Consul-General to Guam and the Northern Mariana Islands.
: The Ambassador of Australia to Denmark is also accredited to Norway and Iceland as a non-resident ambassador.
: The Ambassador of Australia to France is also accredited to Algeria, Chad, Mauritania, Monaco and Morocco as a non-resident ambassador.
: The Ambassador of Australia to Germany is also accredited to Liechtenstein and Switzerland as a non-resident ambassador.
: The High Commissioner of Australia to Ghana is also accredited to Burkina Faso, Côte d'Ivoire, Guinea, Liberia, Mali, Senegal, Sierra Leone and Togo as a non-resident ambassador.
: The Ambassador of Australia to Greece is also accredited to Bulgaria and Romania as a non-resident ambassador.
: The High Commissioner of Australia to India is also accredited to Bhutan as a non-resident ambassador.
: The Ambassador of Australia to Italy is also accredited to Albania, Libya and San Marino as a non-resident ambassador, as well as Australia's Permanent Representative to the Food and Agriculture Organization and Representative to the World Food Programme.
: The High Commissioner of Australia to Kenya is also accredited to Burundi, Rwanda, Somalia, Tanzania and Uganda as a non-resident ambassador. The Australian High Commissioner also acts as Australia's Permanent Representative to the East African Community, United Nations Environment Programme (UNEP) and the United Nations Human Settlements Programme (UN-HABITAT).
: The Ambassador of Australia to South Korea is also accredited to Mongolia and North Korea as a non-resident ambassador.
: The High Commissioner of Australia to Malta is also accredited to Tunisia as a non-resident ambassador.
: The High Commissioner of Australia to Mauritius is also accredited to Comoros, Madagascar and Seychelles as a non-resident ambassador.
: The Ambassador of Australia to Mexico is also accredited to Costa Rica, Cuba, the Dominican Republic, El Salvador, Guatemala, Honduras, Panama and Nicaragua as a non-resident ambassador.
: The High Commissioner of Australia to New Zealand is also accredited to the Cook Islands as a non-resident High Commissioner.
: The High Commissioner of Australia to Nigeria is also accredited to Benin, Republic of the Congo, Cameroon, Gabon, Niger and The Gambia as a non-resident ambassador.
: The Ambassador of Australia to Poland is also accredited to the Czech Republic and Lithuania, as a non-resident ambassador.
: The Ambassador of Australia to Portugal is also accredited to Cape Verde and São Tomé and Príncipe as a non-resident ambassador.
: The Ambassador of Australia to Russia is also accredited to Armenia, Belarus, Kazakhstan, Kyrgyzstan, Moldova, Tajikistan, Turkmenistan and Uzbekistan as a non-resident ambassador.
: The Ambassador of Australia to Saudi Arabia is also accredited to Bahrain and Oman as a non-resident ambassador.
: The Ambassador of Australia to Serbia is also accredited to Macedonia and Montenegro as a non-resident ambassador.
: The High Commissioner of Australia to South Africa is also accredited to Botswana, Lesotho, Mozambique, Namibia and Swaziland as a non-resident High Commissioner, and to Angola as a non-resident ambassador. The High Commissioner also acts as Australia's Ambassador to the Southern African Development Community.
: The Ambassador of Australia to Spain is also accredited to Andorra and Equatorial Guinea as a non-resident ambassador.
: The High Commissioner of Australia to Sri Lanka is also accredited to Maldives as a non-resident High Commissioner.
: The Ambassador of Australia to Sweden is also accredited to Estonia, Finland and Latvia as a non-resident ambassador.
: The High Commissioner of Australia to Trinidad and Tobago is also accredited to Antigua and Barbuda, the Bahamas, Barbados, Belize, Dominica, Grenada, Guyana, Jamaica, Saint Kitts and Nevis, Saint Lucia and Saint Vincent and the Grenadines as a non-resident High Commissioner, and to Haiti and Suriname as a non-resident ambassador. The High Commissioner also acts as Australia's Ambassador to CARICOM.
: The Ambassador of Australia to Turkey is also accredited to Azerbaijan and Georgia as a non-resident ambassador.
: The Ambassador of Australia to the United Arab Emirates is also accredited to Qatar as a non-resident ambassador.
: The High Commissioner of Australia to the United Kingdom is also accredited as Permanent Representative of Australia to the International Maritime Organization.
: The Ambassador of Australia to Zimbabwe is also accredited to Zambia, Malawi, the Democratic Republic of the Congo, and the Republic of the Congo as a non-resident ambassador.

References

External links
 List of Australian heads of mission from the Department of Foreign Affairs and Trade

 
 
Australia
High Commissioners and Ambassadors